The Begum's Fortune (literally "the 500 millions of the begum"), also published as The Begum's Millions, is an 1879 novel by Jules Verne, with some utopian elements and other elements that seem clearly dystopian. It is noteworthy as the first published book in which Verne was cautionary, and somewhat pessimistic about the development of science and technology.

Plot summary
Two men inherit a vast fortune as descendants of a French soldier who settled in India and married the immensely rich widow of a native prince, the begum of the title. One of the inheritors, a French physician named Dr. Sarrasin, decides to establish a utopian model city constructed and maintained with public health as its government's primary concern. The other is a German scientist Prof. Schultze, a militarist and racist. Schultze decides to make his own utopia—a city devoted to the production of ever more powerful and destructive weapons—and vows to destroy Sarrasin's city. Both men convince the United States government to cede its sovereignty over two cities for the creation of their utopian city-states. One is Ville-France on the western side of the Cascades, and the other is Stahlstadt, on the east side.

Most of the action takes place in Stahlstadt, a vast industrial and mining complex, where ores are made into steel, then made into weapons. Stahlstadt becomes in a few years the world's biggest producer of arms. Schultze is Stahlstadt's dictator, whose very word is law and who makes all significant decisions personally.

An Alsatian named Marcel Bruckmann relocates to Stahlstadt, and quickly rises high in its hierarchy, gains Schultze's personal confidence, spies out some well-kept secrets, and sends a warning to his French friends. It turns out that Schultze is not content to produce arms, but fully intends to use them first against Ville-France, then establish Germany's worldwide rule.

Two weapons are being produced – a super-cannon capable of firing massive incendiary charges to Ville-France, and shells filled with gas. Schultze's gas is designed not only to suffocate its victims but at the same time also freeze them. Unfortunately for Schultze, the incendiary charge fired by the super-cannon at Ville-France not only renders the cannon unusable but also misses its mark. The charge flies over the city and into space. As Schultze prepares orders for the final assault, a gas projectile in the office accidentally explodes and kills him.

Stahlstadt collapses since Schultze had kept everything in his own hands and never appointed any deputy. It goes bankrupt and becomes a ghost town. Bruckmann and his friend, Dr. Sarrasin's son, take it over. Schultze would remain forevermore in his self-made tomb, on display as he had planned to do to his foes, while the good Frenchmen take over direction of Stahlstadt in order to let it "serve a good cause from now on.", its arms production being used to defend Ville-France.

Influence, commentary, and appraisals
The book was seen as an early premonition of the rise of Nazi Germany, with its main villain being described by critics as "a proto-Hitler". It reflects the mindset prevailing in France following its defeat in the Franco-German War of 1870–1871, displaying a bitter anti-German bias completely absent from pre-1871 Verne works such as Journey to the Center of the Earth where all protagonists (save one Icelander) are Germans and quite sympathetic ones. In his extensive review of Verne's works, Walter A. McDougall
commented with the regard to The Begum's Millions: "After the Franco-Prussian War, Verne began to invent mad scientists and evil geniuses".

Throughout the book, Verne repeatedly ridicules Schultze's racist ideas and their author (the word "Vaterland" in German continually occurs within the French rendering of Schultze's diatribes). As reviewer Paul Kincaid points out, Verne's ridiculing of the German's ethnic stereotyping can be regarded as itself part of an ethnic stereotyping in the opposite direction.

At the time of writing, public opinion in France was moved by the liberal subscriptions made by the citizens of San Francisco to a relief fund for the sick and wounded soldiers of France during the Franco-Prussian war. In acknowledgement, the French government donated to the newly established San Francisco Art Association a collection of copies from original marbles in the Louvre, including twenty-five pieces of the Parthenon frieze.

Researcher George Klein noted that "The Begum's Fortune shares its main theme with Verne's Facing the Flag (Original French title: Face au drapeau), published in 1896: French patriotism faced with the threat of futuristic super-weapons (what would now be called weapons of mass destruction) and emerging victorious".

Film adaptations 
Tajemství Ocelového města (The Secret of Steel City), a 1979 movie made in former Czechoslovakia, directed by Ludvík Ráža.

See also

 Memories (1995 film), the third part Cannon Fodder contains some similarities
 "Sultana's Dream", a 1905 utopian feminist Bengali science fiction short story by Begum Rokeya Sakhawat Hussain

References

External links

 
Versions
The Begum's Fortune, scanned book via Internet Archive, illustrated. Translated by W. H. G. Kingston Considered a poor translation.
 

Resources
Review by Michael Dirda
Review by Cheryl Morgan
Review by Paul Kincaid
Advertisement for the new translation by Stanford Luce

1879 French novels
Novels by Jules Verne
1879 science fiction novels
French science fiction novels
Utopian novels
Fictional rivalries
Military fiction
Weapons of mass destruction in fiction
French novels adapted into films
Novels set in Oregon
Novels set in India